Mohammed Dolar Mahmud (born December 30, 1988) is a Bangladeshi first-class cricketer. A former Bangladesh Under-19's representative, he plays domestic cricket for Khulna Division. Mahmud has also played for Bangladesh A. He made his One Day International debut in 2008.

He picked up a 4/28 match winning haul to win the match against Zimbabwe at Zimbabwe in 2009 for which he won the man of the match award.

External links

1988 births
Living people
Bangladeshi cricketers
Bangladesh One Day International cricketers
Khulna Division cricketers
Khulna Tigers cricketers
Asian Games gold medalists for Bangladesh
Asian Games medalists in cricket
Cricketers at the 2010 Asian Games
Victoria Sporting Club cricketers
Sheikh Jamal Dhanmondi Club cricketers
Chittagong Division cricketers
Comilla Victorians cricketers
Medalists at the 2010 Asian Games
People from Narail District